Virginio Cesarini (20 October 1595, in Rome – 1 April 1624, in Rome) was an Italian poet and intellectual.

Youth and Education
The son of Giuliano Cesarini, duke of Civitanova, and his wife Livia Orsini, he was sent together with his brother Alessandro to study at Parma, where he was hosted by duke Ranuccio I Farnese. During this period, as a result of a fall from a horse and an inept operation, his health, already delicate, became even more fragile. He returned to Rome in 1610, and pursued a range of interests including theology, jurisprudence, mathematics and astronomy, as was consistent with prevailing ideas about a cultural education, founded on Aristotelian philosophy.

Career in Rome
He was on friendly terms with Cardinal Robert Bellarmine and Maffeo Barberini (later Pope Urban VIII) as well as with Prince Federico Cesi, patron of the Accademia dei Lincei. In 1618, Cesarini became a member of the Accademia. It was here that he encountered both Galileo and Giovanni Ciampoli. Thus he became familiar with Galileo’s experimental methodology, which had a profound influence on him.

He served as chamberlain to Pope Gregory XV, and was confirmed in his post by his successor, Urban VIII and promoted to Chief Chamberlain. In the Accademia dei Lincei he served as a link between scientists who were working in different cities of Italy, and encouraged Galileo, who was facing criticism from conservative circles.

Friendship with Galileo
In 1619, the Jesuit Orazio Grassi, writing under the pseudonym Lotario Sassi, published Libra Astronomica ac Philosophica, which attacked Galileo.  In May 1622, Cesarini wrote to Galileo asking him to publish a reply to Sarsi, which he owed it to the world to write.  In October of the same year, Galileo’s response, The Assayer, was ready.  It was published the following year, in the form of a letter to Cesarini.

See also
Ferdinando Cesarini, Virginio Cesarini's brother.

References

External links
 
 

Italian scholars
Italian poets
1595 births
1624 deaths
Galileo Galilei
Members of the Lincean Academy
Baroque writers